Alec MacKaye (born 1966) is an American singer and musician best known as a member of the DC hardcore bands Untouchables, The Faith, and Ignition. In the mid-1990s Alec joined the band The Warmers as a vocalist and guitarist. Mondo James Dean, an anthology of poetry and short-fiction edited by Richard Peabody and Lucinda Ebersole, was dedicated to MacKaye.

Personal life
MacKaye is the younger brother of Minor Threat & Fugazi singer and guitarist Ian MacKaye. His sister in law, Amy Farina was a member of The Warmers with Alec years prior to marrying his brother. He is shown on the cover of Minor Threat's self-titled EP, Minor Threat, and later the Complete Discography.  He is also featured on the cover of The Teen Idles' Minor Disturbance EP.

Filmography
Alec was interviewed in the documentary film Salad Days.

References

External links
The Faith interview
1996 interview with Alec MacKaye
2010 Interview with Alec MacKaye on Dissonance Radio CPR Washington, DC

1966 births
Living people
Singers from Washington, D.C.
American punk rock singers
American punk rock guitarists
American rock guitarists
American male guitarists
Guitarists from Washington, D.C.
20th-century American guitarists
The Faith (American band) members
20th-century American male musicians
The Warmers members
Untouchables (punk band) members